Ernani Henrique Chaves Aguiar (born 30 August 1950 in Petrópolis, Rio de Janeiro, Brazil) is a Brazilian composer, choral conductor, and musicologist.

Life and career
A scholarship winner to the Argentine Mozarteum, Aguiar studied under various composers and conductors in South America and later in Europe, including Sergiu Celibidache.  As a musicologist, he has specialized in the revising, editing, and revival of works by composers of the 18th century Minas Gerais School.  He has written a number of instrumental pieces, but his most famous works are his choral pieces, such as the fiery Salmo 150, composed in 1975 and published in 1993, which features rhythmic backgrounds with very rapid articulations.  Salmo 150 has proved a very popular piece among choral conductors worldwide, particularly within the American Choral Directors Association.

He is currently a professor of music at the Federal University of Rio de Janeiro, a fellow of the Villa-Lobos Institute, and a member of the Academia Brasileira de Música.

Choral works 
 Cantilena, para coro "a capella"
 Danças, para barítono e cordas, 1993
 Falai de Deus, para coro "a capella" 
 Missa Brevis
 Missa Brevis II in honorem S. Francisci Assisiensis, para coro "a capella"
 Missa Brevis III
 O sacrum convivium, para coro misto "a capella"
 Oração de São Francisco, para coro misto "a capella"
 Psalm 74
 Psalmus CL, para coro "a capella"
 Refrão, para coro misto "a capella"
 Sacipererê, para coro infantil "a capella"
 Salmo 150 (Psalm 150), 1993
 Venid, para coro "a capella"
 Ave Maria SSATB a capella Instrumental works 
 Bifonia nº 1 e nº 2, para flauta e fagote Duo, para violino e cello, 1986 
 Melorritmias, para flauta Miniaturas, para clarineta e piano Sonatina, para piano Toques de cabocolinhos, para piano Três peças, para trompete e piano, 1971
 Violoncelada, para oito violoncelos, 1993

 Operatic works 
 O menino Maluquinho, 1993

 Orchestral works 
 Cantata de Natal, para coro e orquestra Cantata O menino maluquinho, para coro e orquestra, 1989
 Cantos sacros para orixás, para coro e orquestra, 1994
 Sinfonietta prima, para orquestra sinfônica'', 1990
 "Quatro mementos No 3"

References

20th-century classical composers
Brazilian classical composers
Brazilian male composers
Brazilian conductors (music)
Brazilian musicologists
1950 births
Living people
Mozarteum University Salzburg alumni
People from Petrópolis
Brazilian choral conductors
Academic staff of the Federal University of Rio de Janeiro
Male classical composers
20th-century Brazilian musicians
20th-century conductors (music)
21st-century conductors (music)
20th-century male musicians
21st-century male musicians
21st-century Brazilian musicians
21st-century classical composers